, a.k.a. Goraku is the third studio album by Japanese band Tokyo Jihen, released on September 26, 2007 in Japan through EMI Music Japan and Virgin Music. The album was produced by the band and Japanese recording engineer Uni Inoue.
The album contains thirteen tracks and has spawned two singles.
The lead single, "O.S.C.A.", was released on July 11, 2007. "Killer-tune" followed as the second single on August 22, 2007.

Background 
Its thirteen tracks were carefully selected from a vast number of demos created by the band, with all tracks featuring music written by members other than lead vocalist Ringo Sheena. This was a different direction for the band, most of whose previous material had been composed by Ringo Sheena. The record includes seven tracks from guitarist Ukigumo, five tracks from keyboard player Ichiyo Izawa and one composed by bassist Seiji Kameda. Drummer Toshiki Hata was also asked to contribute, but he declined.

After the album's release, the song "Kingyo no Hako" was picked to be the film Mōryō no Hako's theme song.

Track listing 
Credits adapted from Ringo Sheena's website.

Charts and certifications

Charts

Sales and certifications

Notes and references

External links 
Tokyo Jihen Discography

Tokyo Jihen albums
2007 albums